GreenTech is an American-based company which designs and installs modular turf and vegetative systems on athletic turf fields, rooftops, green roofs, urban agriculture and golf courses. Its products have been used in world-known sporting events, such as the turf used in the Athens Olympic Stadium for the 2004 Olympic Games and the Bird's Nest Stadium for the 2008 Olympic Games.

Featured projects
 Silvercup Studios, largest green roof in New York City
 Bird's Nest Stadium, Beijing
 Lane Stadium, Virginia Tech
 Spartan Stadium, Michigan State
 Francisco Montaner Stadium, Puerto Rico
 Caves Valley Golf Club, Owings Mills, Maryland
 Peachtree Golf Club, Atlanta
 Green roof on parking deck, Chicago
 Millennium Stadium, Cardiff, Wales
 Athens Olympic Stadium, Athens
 Giants Stadium, East Rutherford, New Jersey
 The Championships, Wimbledon, London 
 Urban wheat field, New York City
 Luzhniki Stadium, Moscow

References

Companies based in Richmond, Virginia